Pleasant Lake is located by Brasie Corners, Macomb, St. Lawrence County, New York. The outlet creek flows into the Indian River. 

Fish species present in the lake are largemouth bass, northern pike, yellow perch, bluegill, and walleye. There is a town owned boat launch located on Pleasant Lake Road.

References

Lakes of St. Lawrence County, New York